Winnick is a surname. Notable people with the surname include:

David Winnick, British Labour Party politician
Gary Winnick, American financier
Gary Winnick (game developer), American computer game designer, writer, artist and animator
Katheryn Winnick, Canadian film and television actress
Maurice Winnick,  English musician and dance band leader

See also
Winick
Winnicki
Winnik
Winwick (disambiguation)
Vinnick